Darren Cahill and Mark Kratzmann were the defending champions and lost in the second round to Stefan Edberg and Pete Sampras.

Jeremy Bates and Kevin Curren won in the final 6–2, 7–6 against Henri Leconte and Ivan Lendl.

Seeds
The top four seeded teams received byes into the second round.

Draw

Finals

Top half

Bottom half

External links
 1990 Stella Artois Championships Doubles Draw

Doubles